Megadim (lit. Precious) is a moshav in northern Israel. Located on the Mediterranean coast near Atlit and Highway 4, about 12 kilometres south of Haifa, it falls under the jurisdiction of Hof HaCarmel Regional Council.

History
It was founded in 1949 by Jewish immigrants and refugees from Maghreb and Egypt. Its name is a Biblical word, mentioned in Deuteronomy 33:13 : " May the Lord bless this land with the precious dew from heaven above." and in the Song of Songs 4:13;
Thy shoots are a park of pomegranates, with precious fruits; henna with spikenard plants.

Notable people
Elida Gera (1931-2017), film director, dancer, and choreographer
Rabbi Shlomo Amar (born 1948), served as Megadim rabbi in 1973

References

Moshavim
Populated places established in 1949
Populated places in Haifa District
1949 establishments in Israel
Egyptian-Jewish culture in Israel
Maghrebi Jewish culture in Israel